Presidential elections were held in Nigeria on 19 April 2003. The result was a victory for incumbent Olusegun Obasanjo of the People's Democratic Party, who defeated his closest opponent Muhammadu Buhari by over 11 million votes. Voter turnout was 69.1%.

Background
New elections were organised for the first time for 15 years in Nigeria by a civilian government. Olusegun Obasanjo was a civilian president since 1999, after hanging up his uniform. Although he and his party were the clear favourites, he was accused of manipulating the ballot.

Electoral fraud
Millions of people voted several times. The police in Lagos uncovered an electoral fraud, finding five million false ballots.

International observers, including the European Union, determined various irregularities in 11 of the 36 Federal States. Thus in many cases votes were pre-filled or results were later amended. In some states those did not fulfil minimum standard for democratic elections.

Nearly all opposition parties refused to recognise the result. The electoral committee noted for example that in the city Warri in the Niger delta of 135,739 voters, 133,529 voted for the parliamentary election. Observers reported, however, that up to the Saturday afternoon no elections and only some polling stations had opened. Also the counting time was very long compared with other countries pointed according to observers on possible electoral fraud.

Results

References

Presidential elections in Nigeria
Pres
Presidential election
Nigeria president